Alberto López Díaz is a Cuban politician and the governor of Villa Clara Province since 8 February 2020. He was formerly the president of a ward (consejo popula) in Santa Clara, Cuba.

References

External links
 Alberto López Díaz - EcuRed

Cuban politicians
Year of birth missing (living people)
Living people